Idrottsföreningen Brommapojkarna Damlag, more commonly known as Brommapojkarna (meaning the Bromma boys) or simply BP, is a women's football club from Bromma, in Stockholm Municipality, Sweden. The team, a section of IF Brommapojkarna, was founded in 1971 and promoted to the second tier Elitettan in 2014.

The club play their home games at Grimsta IP in Stockholm. The team colours are red and black. The club is affiliated to the Stockholms Fotbollförbund and has an associated men's team who play in the lower categories.

Current squad

Former players
For details of current and former players, see :Category:IF Brommapojkarna (women) players.

References

External links
 IF Brommapojkarna – Official website 

Women's football clubs in Sweden
1971 establishments in Sweden
Association football clubs established in 1971
Sport in Uppsala County
IF Brommapojkarna